The Denmark national futsal team is controlled by the Danish Football Association, the governing body for futsal in Denmark and represents the country in international futsal competitions, such as the FIFA Futsal World Cup and UEFA Futsal Championship.

Tournament records

FIFA Futsal World Cup

UEFA European Futsal Championship

References

External links
Danish Football Association

European national futsal teams
Futsal